The Honda CRF450X is an off-road motorcycle made by Honda Motor Company. It currently has a  liquid-cooled single-cylinder engine.  First offered in 2005, the CRF450X shares very little with the CRF450R motocrosser.

The CRF450X has seen massive success in the Baja 1000, seeing 11 victories and another 5 wins in the Baja 500.  Approximately 27,000 CRF450Xs have sold since October 2018.

First generation: 2005-2007
The 2005 featured a wide-ratio transmission, electric start, and an 18-inch rear wheel.

Second generation: 2008-2017

For the 2008 model year, the CRF450X received a steering damper, smaller fuel tank, and a revised accelerator pump.

Third generation: 2019-Present

For the 2019 model year, the CRF450X was an all new design, receiving fuel injection, and a new CRF450R-based motor and chassis.  CRF450X revisions to the motor include more crank mass & revised piston shape.

References

CRF450X